The coxcomb prominent (Ptilodon capucina) is a moth of the family Notodontidae. It is a common species throughout the Palearctic realm from Ireland to Japan. It was first described by Carl Linnaeus in his 1758 10th edition of Systema Naturae.

This species has brown forewings, varying considerably in tone, with indistinct darker markings. The hindwings are buffish with a black spot at the tornus. At rest, the species has a very distinctive profile with tufts of hairs protruding upwards from the thorax and the hind edge of the forewings (this latter feature shared with other prominents). The margins of the forewings are also wavy. This rather "lumpy" appearance has led to the rather fanciful comparison to the comb on a cock's head. Two broods are produced each year with adults on the wing in May and June and again in August and September. This moth flies at night and is attracted to light.

The larva is green or brown with a yellow stripe down each side and two red humps at the rear end. It is polyphagous and feeds on a wide variety of deciduous trees and shrubs (see list below). The species overwinters as a pupa.

  The flight season refers to the British Isles. This may vary in other parts of the range.

Recorded food plants 
For detail see Robinson et al., 2010.

Acer - Norway maple
Alnus - alder
Betula - birch
Crataegus - hawthorn
Malus - apple
Populus - poplar
Prunus - bird cherry
Quercus - pedunculate oak
Rosa - rose
Salix - willow
Sorbus - rowan
Tilia - lime
Ulmus - European white elm

References

Further reading
South R. (1907) The Moths of the British Isles,  (First Series), Frederick Warne & Co. Ltd.,  London & NY: 359 pp. online as Lophopteryx camelina

External links

Coxcomb prominent (with photos) on UKMoths

Fauna Europaea
Lepiforum e.V.

Notodontidae
Moths described in 1758
Moths of Europe
Moths of Asia
Taxa named by Carl Linnaeus